Kult (Swedish for "Cult", stylized as KULT) is a contemporary horror role-playing game originally created by Gunilla Jonsson and Michael Petersén with illustrations by Nils Gulliksson, first published in Sweden by Äventyrsspel (later Target Games) in 1991. Kult is notable for its philosophical and religious depth as well as for its mature and controversial content.

The first English edition was published in 1993 by Metropolis Ltd. In 1995,  translated the second Swedish edition into French.

In 2018 current licensor Helmgast released the fourth edition called  Kult: Divinity Lost created by Robin Liljenberg and Petter Nallo. This edition moved the setting from the then-current 1990s to the now-current 2010s and was completely rewritten with new art, layout and a ruleset based on Powered by the Apocalypse. The new edition was well received by critics and fans and won two ennies for Best Writing and Best Cover 2019, and was also nominated for Best Interior Art.

Setting
The default backdrop of Kult is modern-day real-life larger cities; players taking the roles of contemporary multi-genre protagonists, such as private investigators and femme fatales, vigilantes and drug dealers, artists and journalists, or secret agents and mad scientists. In the game, however, all this and the entire world we see, is an "illusion" held together by a monotheistic belief which is unravelling to reveal a darker backdrop where nightmarish monsters lurk, called "reality" in the game. This illusion was created by the Demiurge to hold humanity prisoner and to prevent mankind from regaining the divinity it once had. In the absence of this Demiurge, sinister forces plot to keep us from realizing the truth, or even to plunge the world into an apocalyptic war to restore humanity's ignorance and blind faith in the divine order.

Some symbols and creatures appearing in Kult can also be seen in other Swedish games to which the Kult authors and production team also have contributed. The Mutant Chronicles' universe (created by Nils Gulliksson and Michael Stenmark) its spin-offs share creatures such as Nepharites and Razides which appear in the game.

Entities 
The notion of an originally divine mankind being held captive by sinister forces is borrowed from gnosticism. The cosmological backdrop of Kult is largely based on the Tree of life, the Sephirot and the Qliphoth. It is balanced with the Demiurge and his Archons on one side and Astaroth and his Death Angels on the other. Each Archon or Death Angel represents a value, group or an action (aid organisations, child abuse, mafia, apathy, judicial systems, etc.) over which they have great influence. The Archons and Death Angels have various creatures and cults (thereby the name of the game) to do their bidding and promote their values. Many of these are our jailers who work to maintain the Illusion. Many of the adventures revolve around how these entities' conflicts affect the player characters and the world around them.

Disappearance of the Demiurge 
One of the more central elements of the game is that the Demiurge has disappeared since just before the 20th century, and since then Astaroth, the Archons and the Death Angels have been disputing for power. Many entities have vanished since, and the Illusion has been weakened. The game leaves a lot to the imagination of interpretive game masters regarding reasons for the Demiurge's disappearance as well as the earlier mentioned divinity of mankind.

Realities 
The game concept relies on there being several realities that may appear when the Illusion shatters: Metropolis, the original city which interconnects with all great cities; Inferno and its purgatories, where humans are held captive and tortured after death; Gaia, which connects to nature and nature's destructive forces; The Underworld where strange people from lost worlds live in the depths close to infinity; and Limbo, the Dream World where Dream Princes create their kingdoms and dream wanderers explore tattered dreams close to Vortex (a place of chaos and creation).

Rules

The original system is a skill-based system utilizing 20-sided dice (related to Chaosium's BRP system, which had already been used by Äventyrsspel for their Drakar och Demoner rpgs), with point-based characters. In the game, a natural 1 usually is great success with added bonuses and a natural 20 means a complete failure. Normal characters usually have skill ranges of 3 to 20; to succeed in a skill roll, the player needs to roll equal or below his character's skill. The lower the player rolls below the skill number, the greater the success. Extraordinary characters and inhuman entities can have skill values far above the normal range.

The recent edition KULT: Divinity Lost uses rules that are based on the Apocalypse World rules engine. You roll two ten-sided dice, add possible modifications, and try to reach at least 10 to avoid failure or 15 to gain a complete success. KULT: Divinity Lost also has a system where the Gamemaster builds the campaign around the Player Characters and aims to reach true personal horror.

There are several different official rulesets for combat. The second and third English edition rules use a system based on Damage Effect Factors (DEF). The fourth edition, KULT: Divinity Lost, has less focus on combat than previous editions.

Sorcerers can cast spells from one (or rarely more) of five different Lores; Death, Dream, Madness, Passion and Time & Space. Because these spells have (very) long casting times (up to several days), highly specific and exacting verbal, material and somatic requirements, and can only be cast inside the sorcerer's consecrated temple, these spells are actually more like quasi-religious rituals. These rules evoke a superficial similarity to Hermetical traditions, possibly to heighten the modern real-world aspect of the game setting.

Mental Balance 

Central to the game is the aspect of Mental Balance, which is a sanity-gauge of sorts. In the game's cosmology humans can - at least in theory - regain their lost divine status through a game concept called Awakening in which characters with an extremely high (or low, the game never values positive  or moral traits higher than negative or immoral ones) mental balance are no longer restrained by the rules of the Illusion. Effectively, they escape the prison and become gods.

The closer to equilibrium the character is, the more they are anchored in everyday human reality and the harder it is for the character to see through the veil of The Illusion to the true reality beneath. On the other hand, this protects them from becoming traumatized or insane. The further from this balance point (zero) the character's Mental Balance gets, the more easily they will become emotionally and mentally unbalanced by shocking events. A Kult character can have positive or negative mental balance affected by trauma, influence from creatures or places, or by advantages and disadvantages. The advantages and disadvantages are typically talents and traits that work for or against the character, such as (on the positive side) having animal friendship, artistic talent, body awareness, a code of honor, or (from the negative spectrum) being socially inept, suffering from a drug addiction, sex addiction, paranoia, mystic curse or similar.

Both an unusually high or unusually low (+25/-25) Mental Balance will affect how normal people and animals react to the character in question. The further the character strays away from the zero point, the more sociopathic, strange or eccentric he becomes, as they shed their human quirks and viewpoints and becomes more inhuman. Characters with a very high or very low Mental Balance will start to involuntarily manifest outward physical signs of their ascent or descent; they become either detached saints or Children of the Night. If Mental Balance ever reaches +500/-500, the character Awakens and regains their true potential.

In the fourth edition of Kult the Mental Balance system has been removed, the reason made by the developers is that even if it is interesting it was practically impossible to use other than as a concept.   instead you transcend between different types of Archetypes: The Sleeper, The Aware, The Enlightened that moves you towards Awakening.

Publication history
Kult was originally published by the company Target Games in 1991 as a Swedish role-playing game, and has later been translated into several other languages. Kult has been published in Swedish, German, English, Italian, Spanish, Polish and French.

Metropolis Ltd. published the English-language game through three editions and new supplements, with a new US background and a revised page design and editing led by Terry K. Amthor.

The third English edition of Kult had two English books released in print form: a player's handbook named "Kult Rumours" in 2001 and the core rulebook, subtitled Beyond The Veil, printed in 2004.  Both are currently out of print, though copies can be purchased through secondary and specialized markets.

The license has been the property of first Target Games, then Paradox Entertainment, and, in 2015, Cabinet Holdings.

Current publishers 
Currently, Kult is licensed by Helmgast.

A 2016 Kickstarter campaign funded a new edition of the game, entitled 'Kult: Divinity Lost'. This edition uses a different rules engine than previous editions, one based on Apocalypse World and its Powered by the Apocalypse rules engine. It updates the setting to answer the question “What would Kult had been like if it was released in 2016 instead of 1991?” The game was released in 2018.

In 2017 Free League Publishing published Anders Fager's novel "För Gudinnan" (for the love of the goddess) set in the Kult universe. Fager has also written an audiolouge called "Faraday" set in the Kult adventure Tarroticum.

In 2018 and 2020 Free League Publishing published two novels written by the original creators of Kult, Gunilla Jonsson and Michael Petersén. They are both set in the Kult universe called "Döden är bara början" (Death is only the beginning, 2018) and "De levande döda" (The living dead, 2020)

Controversy
Similar to the moral panic of Dungeons & Dragons in the United States in the 1980s, Kult figured in Swedish controversies of the 1990s. At the time of the game's initial publication, role-playing games in Sweden were still sold primarily through toy stores rather than bookstores or specialized hobby shops. Kult was noted by the general press several times during the decade after its initial publication, and in 1997 the Kult core rules were quoted in a motion in the Parliament of Sweden. The motion was to stop taxpayer funding of youth groups that were active with role-playing.

Writer Didi Örnstedt and painter Björn Sjöstedt wrote a book, De Övergivnas Armé (Army of the Abandoned), where they warn against the role-playing game hobby, with a particular focus on the game Kult. The title refers to children supposedly ignored by their parents and therefore susceptible to a projected radicalization of RPGs.

Critics of role-playing games have attempted to tie Kult to a 16-year-old Swedish boy who committed suicide by shotgun in November 1996.

The local newspaper Tønsbergs Blad in Tønsberg, Norway similarly used Kult in relation to the disappearance of a boy called Andreas Hammer on July 1, 1994. Andreas Hammer allegedly played Kult the week prior to his disappearance. He is still missing.

Reception

Jeff Koke reviewed Kult for Pyramid #3 (Sept./Oct., 1993), and stated that "All in all, Kult is a very good system and background for roleplayers who are mature enough to delve into truly dark roleplaying. Even for those players who dislike being immersed in depressing, hopeless worlds, the background has enough tidbits of bleak imagery and morsels of horrific scenery that it's worth the cover price just to browse through the Metropolis."

Spin-offs
 Kult (card game) by Bryan Winter.
 In August–November 2011, Dark Horse Comics released a 4 issue mini series based on the RPG.

Notes

External links
 Official home page
 Cabinet Entertainment

Contemporary role-playing games
Horror role-playing games
Swedish role-playing games
Role-playing games introduced in 1991